In music, monody refers to a solo vocal style distinguished by having a single melodic line and instrumental accompaniment. Although such music is found in various cultures throughout history, the term is specifically applied to Italian song of the early 17th century, particularly the period from about 1600 to 1640. The term is used both for the style and for individual songs (so one can speak both of monody as a whole as well as a particular monody). The term itself is a recent invention of scholars. No composer of the 17th century ever called a piece a monody.  Compositions in monodic form might be called madrigals, motets, or even concertos (in the earlier sense of "concertato", meaning "with instruments").

In poetry, the term monody has become specialized to refer to a poem in which one person laments another's death.  (In the context of ancient Greek literature, monody, could simply refer to lyric poetry sung by a single performer, rather than by a chorus.)

History
Musical monody, which developed out of an attempt by the Florentine Camerata in the 1580s to restore ancient Greek ideas of melody and declamation (probably with little historical accuracy), one solo voice sings a melodic part, usually with considerable ornamentation, over a rhythmically independent bass line.  Accompanying instruments could be lute, chitarrone, theorbo, harpsichord, organ, and even on occasion guitar.  While some monodies were arrangements for smaller forces of the music for large ensembles which was common at the end of the 16th century, especially in the Venetian School, most monodies were composed independently.  The development of monody was one of the defining characteristics of early Baroque practice, as opposed to late Renaissance style, in which groups of voices sang independently and with a greater balance between parts.

Other musical streams which came together in the monody were the madrigal and the motet, both of which developed into solo forms after 1600 and borrowed ideas from the monody.

Contrasting passages in monodies could be more melodic or more declamatory:  these two styles of presentation eventually developed into the aria and the recitative, and the overall form merged with the cantata by about 1635.

The parallel development of solo song with accompaniment in France was called the air de cour:  the term monody is not normally applied to these more conservative songs, however, which retained many musical characteristics of the Renaissance chanson.

An important early treatise on monody is contained in Giulio Caccini's song collection, Le nuove musiche (Florence, 1601).

Main composers

 Vincenzo Galilei (1520 – 1591)
 Giulio Caccini (c. 1545 – 1618)
 Emilio de' Cavalieri (c. 1550 – 1602)
 Lucia Quinciani (b. c. 1566)
 Bartolomeo Barbarino (c. 1568 – c. 1617)
 Jacopo Peri (1561 – 1633)
 Claudio Monteverdi (1567 – 1643)
 Alessandro Grandi (c. 1575 – 1630)
 Giovanni Pietro Berti (d. 1638)
 Sigismondo d'India (c. 1582 – 1629)
 Claudio Saracini (1586 – c. 1649)
 Francesca Caccini (1587 – after 1641)
 Benedetto Ferrari (c. 1603 – 1681)

See also
 Monodies by Mehdi Hosseini
 Threnody
 Texture (music)

References and further reading
 Nigel Fortune, "Monody", in The New Grove Dictionary of Music and Musicians, ed. Stanley Sadie.  20 vol.  London, Macmillan Publishers Ltd., 1980.  
 Gustave Reese, Music in the Renaissance.  New York, W.W. Norton & Co., 1954.  
 Manfred Bukofzer, Music in the Baroque Era.  New York, W.W. Norton & Co., 1947.

External links
 
  more on Monody and the Vocal Concerto

Ancient Greek theatre
Baroque music
Renaissance music

Musical texture
Vocal music
Genres of poetry